Noelle Lenihan (born 4 November 1999) is an Irish paralympic discus thrower competing in the F38 category for athletes with cerebral palsy. Lenihan is a double European champion in the event and, as of August 2018, holds the world record in the classification at 32.95 metres.

Career

Lenihan won silver at the 2015 IPC Athletics World Championships, gold at the 2016 and 2018 World Para Athletics European Championships (both with a world record throw) and bronze at the 2016 Summer Paralympics.

Personal life

Lenihan lives in Deliga, near Milford, County Cork. She has cerebral palsy and so competes in F38 classification events. Her left side is weaker than her right, so she throws using the "South African" half-turn style.
Noelle went to school in Hazlewood College Dromcollogher Co.Limerick from 2012 to 2017.

References

1999 births
Living people
Paralympic bronze medalists for Ireland
Sportspeople from County Cork
Medalists at the 2016 Summer Paralympics
Athletes (track and field) at the 2016 Summer Paralympics
Irish female discus throwers
Paralympic medalists in athletics (track and field)
Paralympic athletes of Ireland